Chapaev is a 1934 Soviet war film, directed by the Vasilyev brothers for Lenfilm.

The film is a heavily fictionalised biography of Vasily Ivanovich Chapayev (1887–1919), a Red Army notable commander of the Russian Civil War. It is based on the novel of the same name by Dmitri Furmanov, a Russian writer and Bolshevik commissar who fought together with Chapayev.

According to president Vladimir Putin's statement in 2014, Chapaev is his favorite film of all time.

Plot

The film centers around a Red Army division commanded by Vasily Chapayev in their fight against White Army troops commanded by Colonel Borodzin. A Commissar named Furmanov is delegated to the division from Moscow, and although he initially does not get along with Chapayev, he proves his worth by resolving a conflict that arises when Chapayev's men steal from local peasants and the two become good friends.

With the help of Chapayev's adjutant Petka and the machine gunner Anka (who develop a love interest over the course of the film), and with intelligence provided by Borodzin's defecting aide Petrovich, the division manages to repel an attack from the White Army troops.

Higher – ups in Moscow re-assign Furmanov to another Red Army division, and the situation soon deteriorates. Under the cover of darkness, Borodzin and his men attack Chapayev's headquarters. Despite their heroic efforts, Petka and Chapayev are killed. Their sacrifices are avenged, however, as Anka alerts the rest of the division and a counterattack is shown to be successful in the final shots of the film.

Cast

Boris Babochkin – Vasily Chapayev
Boris Blinov – Dmitry Furmanov
Varvara Myasnikova – Anka
Leonid Kmit – Petka
Illarion Pevtsov – Colonel Sergei Nikolayveitch Borozdin
Stepan Shkurat – Potapov (Petrovich), Borozdin's batman
Vyacheslav Volkov – Elan Brigade Commander
Nikolay Simonov – platoon commander Zhiharev
Elena Volintseva – farmer
Boris Chirkov – farmer
Sergei Vasilyev – Lieutenant
Georgiy Zhzhonov – Teryosha's, Furmanov's orderly
Mikhail Rostovtsev – Veterinarian
Andrei Apsolon – Red Army soldier
Stepan Krylov – Red Army soldier
Georgi Vasilyev – officer with a cigarette
Victor Yablonsky – Cossack Plastun (uncredited)
Emil Gal – vetfeldsher (uncredited)
Konstantin Nazarenko – trouble-making partisan (uncredited)
Pavel Leshkov – Borozdin's interlocutor (uncredited)

Style

Chapayev follows the socialist realist style, the dominant form of art in the Soviet Union during the time period. To maintain a "realistic" depiction of the world, the camera work is predictable and repetitive, almost mechanical.

The relationship between Chapayev and Furmanov, which is central to the plot of the film, is typical for a Soviet socialist realist film. Both men are supremely competent in their respective roles as commander and commissar. Chapayev is a heroic figure who represents the common Russian man; he is uneducated, he swears, and he acts disorderly. In contrast, Furmanov, who represents the Party and Communist ideology, is more orderly and domineering; in scenes where the two interact, Furmanov is positioned higher in the frame to indicate his superior status.

Reception

Chapaev premiered on 6 November 1934, in the Leningrad cinema "Titan"; it quickly became one of the most popular films in the Soviet Union. Within the first year it was watched by 30 million people in the USSR alone. Such was the popularity of the film that an editorial in Pravda on 21 November proclaimed, "The whole country is watching Chapaev".

It was awarded "Best Foreign Film" by the US National Board of Review in 1935 and the Grand-Prix of the Paris World Fair in 1937.

In a 1978 poll of cinema critics, the film was considered one of the best 100 films in history.

Influence

After the release of the film, Chapayev and his assistants Petka and Anka became Russian folklore characters. These three, together with their political commissar Furmanov, are present in a large number of Russian jokes.

The real Chapayev was already a war hero, but the film increased his heroic status further. When boys would play Reds vs. Whites, they would often imagine themselves to be Chapayev or his heroic adjutant Petka.

Bibliography

References

External links

Soviet black-and-white films
1930s war drama films
Lenfilm films
Soviet war drama films
Russian Civil War films
Films set in Russia
Films directed by Sergei Vasilyev
1934 drama films
1934 films